Rhinogekko femoralis, also known as the sharp-tailed spider gecko or Kharan spider gecko, is a species of gecko found in Pakistan and Iran. The IUCN Redlist considers its presence in Iran uncertain. It measures  in snout–vent length.

References

Rhinogekko
Lizards of Asia
Reptiles of Iran
Reptiles of Pakistan
Reptiles described in 1933
Taxa named by Malcolm Arthur Smith